Hasle may refer to:

Denmark
Hasle, Aarhus
Hasle, Bornholm

Norway
Hasle, Oslo
Hasle (station), a metro station at Hasle, Oslo
 Hasle-Løren IL, an association football club
Hasle, Østfold

Switzerland
Hasle, Lucerne in the canton of Lucerne
 Hasle LU railway station
Hasle bei Burgdorf in the canton of Bern